Pierre Lambert de la Motte, MEP (16 January 1624 – 15 January 1679) was a French bishop. He was a founding member of the Paris Foreign Missions Society and became a missionary in Asia.

Biography
Lambert de la Motte was born 16 January 1624 in La Boissière, Calvados. These were sent to the Far East as Apostolic vicars.

On 29 July 1658 Pope Alexander VII appointed him as the first Apostolic Vicar of Cochin and as titular bishop of Beirut. On 11 June 1660 he was consecrated bishop by Victor Le Bouthillier, Archbishop of Tours. The three bishops left France (1660–62) to go to their respective missions, and crossed Persia and India on foot, since Portugal would have refused to take non-Padroado missionaries by ship, and the Dutch and the English refused to take Catholic missionaries.

Mgr Lambert left Marseilles on 26 November 1660 accompanied by Fathers De Bourges and Deydier, and reached Mergui in Siam 18 months later. Mgr Pallu joined Mgr Lambert in the capital of Siam, Ayutthaya, after 24 months overland, but Mgr Cotolendi died upon arrival in India on 6 August 1662. Siam thus was the first country to receive the evangelization efforts of the Paris Foreign Missions Society, to be followed by new missions later in Cochinchina, Tonkin and parts of China.
 
In 1664, Mgr Lambert together with Mgr Pallu presided a synod in Ayutthaya. They founded in 1665-66 the general seminary in Ayutthaya, Siam (the Seminary of Saint Joseph then Seminary of the Holy Angels, at the origin of the College General now in Penang, Malaysia).

In 1669, Mgr Lambert went to Tonkin together with the secular priests Jacques de Bourges and Gabriel Bouchard to establish a church there, and created the congregation of the Lovers of the Holy Cross (Amantes de la Croix de Jésus-Christ) in 1670.

Mgr Lambert chiefly worked in Siam; he went to Cochinchina in two occasions: from September 1671 to March 1672, and from September 1675 to  March 1676.

He died in 1679, in the capital Ayutthaya of Siam.

See also
France–Thailand relations

Notes

1624 births
1679 deaths
French Roman Catholic titular bishops
Paris Foreign Missions Society missionaries
17th-century Roman Catholic bishops in Vietnam
French Roman Catholic missionaries
French Roman Catholic bishops in Asia
Christian missionaries in the Ayutthaya Kingdom
Roman Catholic missionaries in Thailand
Roman Catholic missionaries in Vietnam
French expatriates in Vietnam
French expatriates in Thailand